Heterolepidoderma is a genus of gastrotrichs belonging to the family Chaetonotidae.

The species of this genus are found in Europe and Southern America.

Species:
 Heterolepidoderma acidophilum Kanneby, Todaro & Jondelius, 2012
 Heterolepidoderma arenosum Kisielewski, 1988

References

Gastrotricha